Ermete Realacci (born 1 May 1955 in Sora) is an Italian politician.

In the early 1970s Realacci participated in the Christian Animation Movement (MAC). After finishing his studies at the classical high school, he worked as a publicist. He has been leading Legambiente since the early years, of which he was president from 1987 to 2003 and of which he is still honorary president, making it the most widespread and rooted Italian environmental association in the territory and becoming one of the most exponents of Italian environmentalism.

He has served as Deputy from 2001 to 2018 and in 2008 he has been Minister of the Environment of the Shadow Government of Walter Veltroni.

References

1955 births
Living people
21st-century Italian politicians
Democracy is Freedom – The Daisy politicians
Democratic Party (Italy) politicians